Leen Poortvliet (born 20 July 1943) is a Dutch racing cyclist. He rode in the 1969 Tour de France and won the 16th 4 Jours de Dunkerque / Tour du Nord-pas-de-Calais(SPP) in 1970.

References

1943 births
Living people
Dutch male cyclists
Place of birth missing (living people)